The molecular formula C22H32O3 may refer to:

 Medrysone
 Medroxyprogesterone
 Metenolone acetate
 ORG-2058
 Penostatin A
 Sargachromanol B
 Stenbolone acetate
 Testosterone propionate